Techniques of neutralization are a theoretical series of methods by which those who commit illegitimate acts temporarily neutralize certain values within themselves which would normally prohibit them from carrying out such acts, such as morality, obligation to abide by the law, and so on. In simpler terms, it is a psychological method for people to turn off "inner protests" when they do, or are about to do something they themselves perceive as wrong.

The theory

The idea of such techniques was first postulated by David Matza (born May 1, 1930) and Gresham Sykes (born 1922) during their work on Edwin Sutherland's Differential Association in the 1950s. While Matza and Sykes were at the time working on juvenile delinquency, they hypothocized that the same techniques could be found throughout society and published their ideas in Delinquency and Drift 1964.

Matza and Sykes' hypothesis states that people are always aware of their moral obligation to abide by the law, and that they have the same moral obligation within themselves to avoid illegitimate acts. Thus, they reasoned, when a person did commit illegitimate acts, they must employ some sort of mechanism to silence the urge to follow these moral obligations.

This hypothesis rejects other theories which suggested that groups containing delinquents have set up their own permanent moral code which completely replaces moral obligations. Thus, Matza and Sykes were able to explain how offenders 'drift' from illegitimate to legitimate lifestyles repeatedly, as they retain the moral code rather than wipe it clean to be replaced by a more illegitimate one as previous theories suggested.

The techniques

The theory was built up upon four observations:

 Delinquents express guilt over their illegal acts.
 Delinquents frequently respect and admire honest, law-abiding individuals.
 A line is drawn between those whom they can victimize and those they cannot.
 Delinquents are not immune to the demands of conformity.

These theories were brought from positivistic criminology which looked at epistemological perspectives of delinquency.

From these, Matza and Sykes created the following methods by which, they believed, delinquents justified their illegitimate actions:

 Denial of responsibility. The offender will propose that they were victims of circumstance or were forced into situations beyond their control.
 Denial of injury. The offender insists that their actions did not cause any harm or damage.
 Denial of the victim. The offender believes that the victim deserved whatever action the offender committed.
 Condemnation of the condemners. The offenders maintain that those who condemn their offense are doing so purely out of spite, or are shifting the blame off of themselves unfairly.
 Appeal to higher loyalties. The offender suggests that his or her offense was for the greater good, with long term consequences that would justify their actions, such as protection of a friend.

These five methods of neutralization generally manifest themselves in the form of arguments, such as:

 "It wasn't my fault"
 "It wasn't a big deal. They could afford the loss"
 "They had it coming"
 "You were just as bad in your day"
 "My friends needed me. What was I going to do?"

In 2017, Bryant et al. analysed statements made by 27 individuals accused of participation in the Rwanda genocide and found two neutralization techniques that had not been identified before:
 Appeal to good character. The offender will "assert their good deeds or admirable character attributes that they contend render them incapable of committing (genocidal) crimes".
 Victimisation. The offender will argue how she, he, people close to him or his ethnic group were under threat or have suffered loss by a third party (in case of the Rwanda genocide the Tutsi).

In 2018 Muel Kaptein and Martien van Helvoort have developed a model, called the Amoralizations Alarm Clock, that covers all existing amoralizations in a logical way. 
Amoralizations, also called neutralizations, or rationalizations, are defined as justifications and excuses for deviant behavior.  Amoralizations are important explanations for the rise and persistence of deviant behavior. 
There exist many different and overlapping techniques of amoralizations. 
https://doi.org/10.1080/01639625.2018.1491696

Acceptance

Further research in the hypothesis has produced inconclusive results. Offenders have been found both with a solid belief in their moral obligations, and without. Travis Hirschi, a social bond theorist, also raised the question as to whether the offender develops these techniques to neutralise their qualms regarding offending before or after they actually commit the offence.

The Neutralization Hypothosis was introduced by Sykes and Matza in 1957, facing the then prevailing criminological wisdom that offenders engage in crime because they adhere to an oppositional subcultural rule set that values law breaking and violence, they rejected this perspective.  Subsequent research revealed that the original formulation of the Sykes and Matza's theory explains only the behavior of "conventionally attached individuals" not those  of "nonconventionally oriented individuals" such as "criminally embedded street offenders". Professor Volkan Topalli, at Georgia State University, in his article The Seductive Nature of Autotelic Crime: How Neutralization Theory Serves as a Boundary Condition for Understanding Hardcore Street Offending, explains that for those groups "guilt is not an issue at all because their crimes are not only considered acceptable, but attractive and desirable".

See also
Amoralizations https://doi.org/10.1080/01639625.2018.1491696

 Deviance (sociology)
 Criminology
 Ethnomethodology
 Rationalization (psychology)
 Social order
 Social control
 Tu quoque
 Victim blaming

References

Ethics
Criminology